SBC Communications, Inc. v. FCC, 154 F.3d 226 (5th Cir. 1998), was a case decided by the United States Court of Appeals for the Fifth Circuit that upheld §§ 271-275 of the Telecommunications Act of 1996 as constitutional against a challenge that the provisions acted as a bill of attainder.

Factual background
Sections 271-275 of the Telecommunications Act of 1996 place limitations on the entrance of the Regional Bell Operating Companies (RBOCs) into the in-region long-distance service market.  SBC Communications challenged these provisions as a bill of attainder that singled out the RBOCs for punishment.

Decision
The Fifth Circuit upheld the statute, holding that §§ 271-275 were not punitive in nature and thus could not be considered a bill of attainder.

References

External links
 

1998 in United States case law
United States Court of Appeals for the Fifth Circuit cases
Federal Communications Commission litigation
United States Constitution Article One case law
AT&T litigation
Bell System